Roag may refer to:
 Roag, Skye, a hamlet on the Isle of Skye, Scottish Highlands
 Roag (2011 TV series),  a Pakistani television drama series
 Roag (2022 TV series),  a Pakistani television drama series